These are the full results of the 2021 South American Under-23 Championships in Athletics which took place between October 16 and 17 at Estadio Modelo Alberto Spencer Herrera in Guayaquil, Ecuador.

Men's results

100 meters

Heats – October 16Wind:Heat 1: +0.9 m/s, Heat 2: +0.5 m/s

Final – October 16

Wind: +0.2 m/s

200 meters

Heats – October 17Wind:Heat 1: +2.6 m/s, Heat 2: +1.4 m/s

Final – October 17

Wind: -0.7 m/s

400 meters
October 16

800 meters
October 17

1500 meters
October 16

5000 meters
October 17

10,000 meters
October 16

110 meters hurdles
October 16Wind: +0.7 m/s

400 meters hurdles
October 17

3000 meters steeplechase
October 16

4 × 100 meters relay
October 17

4 × 400 meters relay
October 17

20,000 meters walk
October 16

High jump
October 17

Pole vault
October 16

Long jump
October 17

Triple jump
October 16

Shot put
October 16

Discus throw
October 17

Hammer throw
October 16

Javelin throw
October 16

Decathlon
October 16–17

Women's results

100 meters

Heats – October 16Wind:Heat 1: +0.6 m/s, Heat 2: +1.1 m/s

Final – October 16

Wind: +0.5 m/s

200 meters

Heats – October 17Wind:Heat 1: +1.5 m/s, Heat 2: +1.4 m/s

Final – October 17

Wind: +0.3 m/s

400 meters
October 16

800 meters
October 17

1500 meters
October 16

5000 meters
October 17

10,000 meters
October 16

100 meters hurdles
October 16Wind: +2.4 m/s

400 meters hurdles
October 17

3000 meters steeplechase
October 16

4 × 100 meters relay
October 17

4 × 400 meters relay
October 17

20,000 meters walk
October 17

High jump
October 16

Pole vault
October 17

Long jump
October 16

Triple jump
October 17

Shot put
October 16

Discus throw
October 16

Hammer throw
October 16

Javelin throw
October 16

Heptathlon
October 16–17

Mixed results

4 × 400 meters relay
October 16

References

South American Championships
Events at the South American Under-23 Championships in Athletics